Pachyschelus is a genus of metallic wood-boring beetles in the family Buprestidae. There are at least 270 described species in Pachyschelus.

See also
 List of Pachyschelus species

References

Further reading

 
 
 
 
 
 
 
 

Buprestidae